Giyath al-Din Muhammad was second ruler of the Emirate of Eretna.

Early reign 
He was born to Eretna and Isfahan Khatun of Jalairs as their youngest son. At time of his father's death he was still studying in the madrassah of Konya, but was preferred over his half-brother Jafar by his emirs and declared ruler in 1352 by his vizier and former teacher Khwaja Ali. However, since he was a minor, authority was in hands of warlords. During Mehmed's reign, Beyliks of Canik became more autonomous and Beylik of Dulkadir captured several towns belonged to Eretnids. However, Zeyneddin Karaca Bey himself soon fled to Muhammad, seeking protection from Mamelukes, however Muhammad's emirs turned him over to Egypt, who executed Karaca in 1353. Soon, Muhammad was deposed by his emirs and his half-brother Jafar reigned for a year. Fled to Karamanids, Muhammad was restored to throne thanks to his governor of Ankara Ibn Kurdi in September 1355, forcing Jafar to flee to Egypt.

Later reign 
He allied with Dulkadirids again in 1361 and marched on Malatya, which was then governed by Mamelukes. Its governor Esendemir Tazı had to retreat, while Mamluk governor of Damascus Yolbuqa forced sides to retreat with its 24,000 strong army. Three years later Muhammad's former teacher and vizier Khwaja Ali surprisingly rebelled and marched on Kayseri. Muhammad had to flee to Al-Kamil Sha'ban, later returning from Syria and capturing the vizier. Soon after vizier's execution, other emirs led by Hajji Shadgaldi and Hajji Ibrahim conspired to kill him and enthrone his 13-year-old son Ali.

References 

1365 deaths

Year of birth unknown
Assassinated royalty
14th-century rulers in Asia
14th-century Turkic people